John Rowlands may refer to:

birth name of Henry Morton Stanley (1841–1904), Welsh-American journalist and explorer
John Rowlands (footballer) (1947–2020), English professional footballer 
John Rowlands (author) (1938–2015), Welsh language novelist and academic
John Rowlands (RAF officer) (1915–2006), George Cross recipient, World War II bomb disposal expert, post-war developer of British A-bomb
John Rowlands (priest) (1925–2004), Anglican Dean of Gibraltar
John Rowlands (Giraldus) (1824–1891), Welsh antiquary and educator
John J. Rowlands (1892–1972), journalist, writer, and outdoorsman
 John Rowlands, programmer of Mayhem in Monsterland and other video games

See also
John Rowland (disambiguation)